Space Atlas: Mapping the Universe and Beyond is a 2012 National Geographic book written by American physicist James S. Trefil, Robinson Professor of Physics at George Mason University. Subdivided into three parts, it contains photography, star charts, and general information surrounding "The Solar System", "The Galaxy", as well as "The Universe". 

Trefil also highlights scientists whose discoveries expanded human knowledge of the universe, such as Nicolaus Copernicus, who contrived the first serious heliocentric model of the solar system, or Jocelyn Bell Burnell, who discovered signals of pulsars. "Space Atlas" is Trefil's 17th book, and similar to his other work, it was geared toward a general audience through an emphasis on visuals and accessible language.

References

Astronomy books
2012 non-fiction books
National Geographic Society books